

Events
The troubadour Falquet de Romans wrote of the departure of the Sixth Crusade
The troubadour Guilhem Figueira denied the efficacy of the crusade indulgence

Births

Deaths

13th-century poetry
Poetry